Irish genealogy is the study of individuals and families who originated on the island of Ireland.

Origins

Genealogy was cultivated since at least the start of the early Irish historic era. Upon inauguration, Bards and poets are believed to have recited the ancestry of an inaugurated king to emphasise his hereditary right to rule. With the transition to written culture, oral history was preserved in the monastic settlements. Dáibhí Ó Cróinín believed that Gaelic genealogies came to be written down with or soon after the practise of annalistic records, annals been kept by monks to determine the yearly chronology of feast days (see Irish annals).

Its cultivation reached a height during the Late Medieval Era with works such as Leabhar Ua Maine, Senchus fer n-Alban, Book of Ballymote, De Shíl Chonairi Móir, Book of Leinster, Leabhar Cloinne Maoil Ruanaidh and the Ó Cléirigh Book of Genealogies. This tradition of scholarship reached its zenith with Leabhar na nGenealach, composed mainly between 1649–1650 in Galway.

Genealogy had at first served a purely serious purpose in determining the legal rights of related individuals to land and goods. Under Fenechas, ownership of land was determined by Agnatic succession, female ownership being severely limited.

Over time, genealogy was pursued for its own merits by the Gaelic learned classes. From , various families such as Ó Cléirigh, Mac Fhirbhisigh, Ó Duibhgeannáin, Mac Aodhagáin and Mac an Bhaird became professional historians. They were often employed by ruling families, the most important of whom included Ó Conchobhair, Ó Neill, Ó Domhnaill, Ó Cellaigh, Mac Murchadha Caomhánach, Mac Carthaigh, Ó Briain, Ó Mael Sechlainn, Mac Giolla Padraig. It also became pervasive among the Anglo-Irish, with the recording of the family trees of FitzGerald, Butler, Burke, Plunkett, Nugent, Bermingham and others.

Some clans, such as Mac Fhirbhisigh and Ó Duibhgeannáin were originally hereditary ecclesiastical families, while others (Ó Cléirigh, Mac an Bhaird, Ó Domhnallain) were dispossessed royalty who were forced to find another profession (see also Irish medical families).

The transmission of this body of lore has resulted in detailed knowledge on the origins and history of many of the tribes and families of Ireland. An anglicised tradition has continued since the 17th-century, translating many of the scripts into English. The practise of genealogy continues to be of importance among the Irish and its diaspora. Historians (such as Dáibhí Ó Cróinín and Nollaig Ó Muraíle) consider the Irish genealogical tradition to have the largest national corpus in Europe.

Irish Genealogical Doctrine

Over the course of several centuries, an evolving genealogical dogma created by the bardic viewed all Irish as descendants of Míl Espáine. This ignored variant traditions, including those recorded in their own works. The reasons behind the doctrine's adoption is rooted in the policies of dynastic and political propaganda.

The doctrine dates from the 10th–12th centuries, as demonstrated in the works of Eochaid ua Flainn (936–1004); Flann Mainistrech; Tanaide; and Gilla Cómáin mac Gilla Samthainde. Many of their compositions were incorporated into the compendium Lebor Gabála Érenn.

It was enhanced and embedded in the tradition by successive generations of historians such as Seán Mór Ó Dubhagáin, Gilla Íosa MacFhirbhisigh and Flann Mac Aodhagáin. By 1600 it was refined to the point that certain Anglo-Irish families were given spurious Gaelic ancestors and origin legends, such was their immersion in Gaelic culture.

The first Irish historian who questioned the reliability of such accounts was Dubhaltach Mac Fhirbhisigh, whose massive Leabhar na nGenealach included disparate and variant recensions. Unlike Geoffrey Keating Foras Feasa ar Éirinn, he did not attempt to synthesise the material into a unified whole, instead recording and transmitting it unaltered. However, historians as late as such as Eugene O'Curry (1794–1862) and John O'Donovan (1806–1861) sometimes accepted the doctrine and a nationalistic interpretation of Irish history uncritically. During the 20th century the doctrine was reinterpreted by the work of historians such as Eoin MacNeill, T. F. O'Rahilly, Francis John Byrne, Kathleen Hughes (historian), and Kenneth Nicholls.  

See also O'Rahilly's historical model, Genetic history of Europe, Genetic history of the British Isles.

Genealogical compilations

The following are manuscripts consisting of genealogies in whole or part.
 Leabhar Adhamh Ó Cianáin
 Book of Ballymote
 The Book of the Burkes
 Leabhar Cloinne Maoil Ruanaidh
 Crichaireacht cinedach nduchasa Muintiri Murchada
 Cuimre na nGenealach
 Leabhar na nGenealach
 Great Book of Lecan
 An Leabhar Muimhneach
 Ó Cléirigh Book of Genealogies
 Leabhar Ua Maine
 Rawlinson B 502
 Senchus fer n-Alban
 Leabhar Clainne Suibhne
 Book of Leinster
 Book of Lecan
 MS H.2.7
 MS Laud 610

Lost works

 Psalter of Cashel
 Book of Cuanu
 Book of Dub Dá Leithe
 Leabhar Airis Cloinne Fir Bhisigh
 Leabhar Airisen Ghiolla Iosa Mhec Fhirbhisigh
 Synchronisms of Flann Mainstreach
 The Chronicle of Ireland
 Norse and Norse-Gaelic pedigrees from the Great Book of Lecan (section)

Organisations
 Irish Genealogical Office
 Genealogical Society of Ireland
 Council of Irish Genealogical Organisations

Burke's Peerage and Landed Gentry
 Burke's Peerage
 Burke's Landed Gentry

21st-century Irish genealogy
 Who Do You Think You Are? (Irish TV series)

Notable Irish genealogists
 Eochaid ua Flannacáin, 936–1004
 Flann Mainistrech, 
 Gilla Cómáin mac Gilla Samthainde, 
 Gilla Críst Ua Máel Eóin, 
 Amhlaoibh Mór mac Fir Bhisigh, 
 Gilla na Naemh Ua Duinn, 
 Giolla Íosa Mac Fir Bisigh, 
 Tanaide Mor mac Dúinnín Ó Maolconaire, 
 Domnall Ó Cuindlis, 
 Lúcás Ó Dalláin, 
 Seán Mór Ó Dubhagáin, 
 Adhamh Ó Cianáin, 
 Ádhamh Cúisín, 
 Murchadh Ó Cuindlis, 
 Giolla Íosa Mór Mac Fhirbhisigh, 
 Giolla na Naomh Ó hUidhrín, 
 Giolla na Naomh Mac Aodhagáin, 
 Geoffrey Keating, 1569–1644
 Cú Choigcríche Ó Cléirigh, 
 Dubhaltach Mac Fhirbhisigh, compiler of Leabhar na nGenealach, 
 James Terry, Jacobite Officer of Arms, 
 Charles O'Conor (historian), 1710–1791
 John Burke, creator of Burke's Peerage, 1787–1848
 William Betham, Ulster King of Arms, 
 John O'Donovan (scholar), 1806–1861
 John O'Hart, popular genealogical writer, 1824–1902
 Edward MacLysaght, Chief Herald, 
 Nollaig Ó Muraíle, academic historian,

Further reading
 De Praesulibus Hiberniae Commentarius, Sir James Ware, 1665
 Ogygia: seu Rerum Hibernicarum Chronologia & etc. ..., Ruaidhrí Ó Flaithbheartaigh, 1685 (published and translated into English by Rev. James Hely, 1783)
 A dissertation on the origin and antiquities of the antient Scots, and notes, critical and explanatory, on Mr. O'Flaherty's text, Charles O'Conor (historian), included in The Ogygia vindicated: against the objections of Sir George Mackenzie, king's advocate for Scotland in the reign of king James II, by Ruaidhrí Ó Flaithbheartaigh, 1775
 On the Heathen State and Topography of Ancient Ireland, Charles O'Conor, 1783
 Lecturers on the Manuscript Materials of Ancient Irish History, Eugene O'Curry, 1861, a collection of 21 lectures
 Ireland before the Normans, Donnchadh Ó Corráin, Dublin, 1972
 A New History of Ireland: Volume IX: Maps, Genealogies, Lists: A Companion to Irish History, Part II: Maps, Genealogies, Lists Vol 9, ed. Theodore William Moody, F. X. Martin, and Francis John Byrne, 1984
 The Irish genealogies as an onomastic source, Nollaig Ó Muraíle, in Nomina No.16, pp. 23–47, 1992
 The Irish Genealogies: Irish History's Poor Relation?, Nollaig Ó Muraíle, London: Irish Texts Society, 2016. 
 Placenames and early settlement in county Donegal, Dónall Mac Giolla Easpaig, in Donegal: History and Society, edited by William Nolan, Liam Ronayne and Mairéad Dunlevy. Dublin, 1996. pp. 149–182.
 Irish Kings and High-Kings. 3rd revised edition, Dublin: Four Courts Press, 2001. 
 A New History of Ireland, volume one, Dáibhí Ó Cróinín, Dublin, 2006

References

Notes

Sources
 Annála Ríoghachta Éireann: Annals of the kingdom of Ireland by the Four Masters, from the earliest period to the year 1616, compiled 1628–1635, Mícheál Ó Cléirigh et al (edited and translated by John O'Donovan, 1856)
 Leabhar na nGenealach, Dubhaltach MacFhirbhisigh, compiled mainly 1649–1660, published 2004–2005
 Blake Family Records, Martin J. Blake, volume one, 1902 and volume two, 1905
 Leabhar Chlainne Suibhne: An Account of the Mac Sweeney Families of Ireland, with Pedigrees, Paul Walsh (priest), 1920
 The Learned Family of O Duigenan, Paul Walsh, Irish Eccleastical Record, 1921
 Topographical Poems by Seán Mór Ó Dubhagáin and Giolla na Naomh Ó hUuidrain, James Carney (scholar) (ed.), 1943
 Poems on the Butlers of Ormond, Cahir and Dunboyne, AD 1400–1650, James Carney (scholar), editor, 1945
 A Genealogical History of the O’Reillys, from Irish of Eoghan Ó Raghallaigh, James Carney (scholar), editor, 1950
 Poems on the O’Reillys, James Carney (scholar), editor, 1970
 The Surnames of Ireland, Edward MacLysaght, 1978
 A British Myth of Origins?, John Carey (Celticist) in History of Religions 31, pp 24–38, 1991
 Early Irish and Welsh Kinship, Thomas Charles-Edwards, Oxford, 1993
 Seán Ó Donnabháin, An Cúigiú Máistir, Nollaig Ó Muraíle, in Scoláirí Gaeilge: Léchtaí Cholm Cille XXVII, Eag. R. Ó hUiginn. Maigh Nuad, 1997, Lch. 11–82
 Irish genealogical collections: the Scottish dimension, Nollaig Ó Muraíle, in International Congress of Celtic Studies 10 (1995), pp. 251–264, 1999
 Iris Mhuintir Uì Dhonnabháin, O'Donovan History 2000, Published by the O'Donovan Clan, Skibbereen, Ireland. Article by Michael R. O'Donovan
 The Tribes of Galway, Adrian James Martyn, Galway, 2001
 Royal Roots, Republican Inheritance – The Survival of the Office of Arms, Susan Hood, Dublin, 2002
 "They’re family!": cultural geographies of relatedness in popular genealogy, Catherine Nash, in Sara Armed, Anne-Marie Fortier and Mimi Sheller eds. Uprootings/Regroundings: Questions of Home and Migration, Berg, Oxford and New York, 179–203, 2003
 Leabhar na nGenealach, Dubhaltach Mac Fhirbhisigh, 2003–2004
 Genetic kinship, Cultural Studies, 18(1): 1–34, Catherine Nash, 2004.
 Irish Origins, Celtic Origins: Population Genetics, Catherine Nash, Cultural Politics, Irish Studies Review, 14 (1): 11–37, 2006
 Of Irish descent: origin stories, genealogy, & the politics of belonging, Catherine Nash, Syracuse University Press, 2008.

External links
 The Importance of Genealogy in Gaelic Society 
 Irish surnames and Y-DNA at AncestralJourneys.org
 https://web.archive.org/web/20071114223625/http://www.peterowen.com/pages/nonfic/Guinness.htm
 O'Connor, Roderic, A Historical and Genealogical Memoir of the O'Connors, Kings of Connaught, and their Descendants. Dublin: McGlashan & Gill. 1861.
 O'Donovan, John and the Rt. Hon. Charles Owen O'Conor Don, The O'Conors of Connaught: An Historical Memoir. Dublin: Hodges, Figgis, and Co. 1891.
 https://web.archive.org/web/20101128140613/http://ria.ie/publications/journals/eriu/online-access/57-(2007).aspx
 T. F. O'Rahilly Papers
 Carey, John. The Irish National Origin-Legend: Synthetic Pseudohistory . Department of Anglo-Saxon, Norse and Celtic, University of Cambridge, 1994.
 Chief Herald of Ireland.
 An Irish Arms Crisis – Critical essay on status of the Office of the Chief Herald.
 Full text and explanatory memorandum of Genealogy & Heraldry Bill, 2006.
The Fitzpatrick – Mac Giolla Phádraig Clan Society